The 2011 National Football League was a competition run by the Gaelic Athletic Association (GAA) between February and April 2011. It was contested by 33 teams, representing the 32 counties of Ireland plus London. Cork retained the title after a 0–21 to 2–14 win against Dublin.

Format
The 2011 the National Football League had four divisions, the top three consisting of eight teams, and Division 4 of nine. Each team played each other team in its division once, with two points awarded for a win, and one for a draw. The top two teams in each of divisions 2, 3 and 4 were promoted, and contested the finals of their respective divisions; the top two teams in Division 1 contested the 2011 NFL final. The bottom two teams in each of divisions 1, 2 and 3 were relegated.

Division 1

Division 1

Table

Fixtures and results

Final

Top scorers
Overall

Single game

Division 2

Table

Fixtures and results

Final

Division 3

Table

Fixtures and results

Final

Division 4

Table

Fixtures and results

Final

References

External links
 Fixtures

 
National Football League
National Football League (Ireland) seasons